Mandela Van Peebles (born June 4, 1994) is an American rapper, film and television actor and producer who has appeared in films such as We the Party, Baadasssss!, and Jigsaw, and the television series Reginald the Vampire.

Personal life
Van Peebles was born in Los Angeles, California. He is one of two children born to director/actor Mario Van Peebles and Lisa Vitello, and a grandson of filmmaker Melvin Van Peebles and Maria (née Marx). He is named after Nelson Mandela.

Filmography

Film

Television

Producer

References

External links

1994 births
Living people
American male child actors
American male television actors
African-American male actors
African-American male child actors
African-American male rappers
Male actors from Los Angeles
American male film actors
American rappers
Rappers from Los Angeles
20th-century American male actors
21st-century American male actors
21st-century American rappers
21st-century American male musicians
20th-century African-American people
21st-century African-American musicians